The Montreal Jofa Titan (1998–99) was a professional women's ice hockey team in the National Women's Hockey League (NWHL). The team played its home games at the Concordia University, Ed Meagher Arena in Montreal, Quebec, Canada.

History
Montreal Jofa Titan began in the Repentigny Senior AA League. The team won the 1995-96 regular season and the 1996 Senior AA Quebec provincial championship. The Jofa Titan joined the National Women's Hockey League (NWHL) in 1998-99.  The team closed in 1999 after just one season in the NWHL.

Season 1998-99

Note:  
GP = Games played,  W = Wins, L = Losses, T = Ties, GF = Goals for, GA = Goals against,  Pts = Points.

Season standing

Playoffs 
Bonaventure Wingstar beat Montreal Jofa-Titan in a 2 games final series to capture the first NWHL Eastern Division Playoff Championship NWHL. Bonaventure Wingstar finished the 2 game total points final with a record of 1 win and 1 tie.
April 17, 1999 - Bonaventure Wingstar 5, Montreal Jofa-Titan 1
April 18, 1999 -  Montreal Jofa-Titan 2 at Bonaventure Wingstar 2

Current roster

Several players arise of Team Quebec 
 Nancy Deschamps
 Stephanie Grenon
 Sylvie Malenfant
 Marie-Claude Roy

Coaching staff
    General Manager:
    Head Coach: Laurier Theriault

Award and honour
1998/99 Eastern Division 1st All Star Team: Isabelle Surprenant (Defense), Nancy Drolet  (Forward).
1998/99 Eastern Division 2sd All Star Team: Marie-Claude Roy (Goalie), Mai-Lan Le    (Forward).

Notable former players
 Nancy Drolet (Canada national Team)
 Mai-Len Lê   (Canada national Team 1998-2000)

References

External links 
 National Women's Hockey League, 1998-99 Jofa Titan Montreal, Quebec  
  National Women's Hockey League by Marc Ouellette

Titan
Women's ice hockey teams in Canada
Jofa Titan
Women in Montreal